The Latin Grammy Hall of Fame is a hall of fame established by the Latin Recording Academy to recognize "early recordings of lasting qualitative or historical significance that were released more than 25 years ago". LARAS is also the same organization that distributes the Latin Grammy Awards. The albums and songs are picked by a panel of recording-arts professionals, such as musicologists and historians, and selected from all major categories of Latin music.

The first inductions were made in 2001 to honor 17 recordings. These included Santana's cover of Tito Puente's "Oye Como Va", Javier Solís's rendition of "Sabor a Mí" and the 1948 performance of Joaquín Rodrigo's Concierto de Aranjuez by Regino Sainz de la Maza and the Orquesta Nacional de España. The inductions have each occurred six years apart from one another.

"La Bamba" by Ritchie Valens and Chega de Saudade by João Gilberto were also inducted into the Grammy Hall of Fame in 2000. Getz/Gilberto by Stan Getz and João Gilberto won the Grammy Award for Album of the Year at the 7th Annual Grammy Awards in 1965. "El Manisero (The Peanut Vendor)" by Don Azpiazu and Cuban Jam Sessions in Miniature/Descargas by Cachao were inducted into the National Recording Registry in 2005 and 2012 respectively.  "Eres tú" by Mocedades placed second on the 1973 Eurovision Song Contest. Brazilian musician Antônio Carlos Jobim is the artist with the most works inducted into the Latin Grammy Hall of Fame with four recordings.

Recipients

 Each year is linked to an article about the Latin Grammy Awards ceremony of that year.

See also
Billboard Latin Music Hall of Fame
Category:Music halls of fame
Grammy Hall of Fame
International Latin Music Hall of Fame
Latin Songwriters Hall of Fame
List of halls and walks of fame

References

2001 establishments in the United States
Awards established in 2001
Hall of Fame
 
Music L
Music halls of fame
Music-related lists